Namo or NaMo may refer to:

Film

 NaMo (film), an upcoming film by Rupesh Paul
 Namo Venkatesa, a 2010 Telugu language film

People
 Narendra Modi (born 1950), occasionally shortened to NaMo, Indian politician and the current PM of India
 Namo Narain Meena (born 1943), former Minister of State for Finance in Government of India

Places
 Namo Falls, waterfalls in Guam
 Namo River, a river in Guam
 Na Mo District, a district in Laos

Other uses
 Námo, a character from J. R. R. Tolkien's Middle-earth
 Duke Namo, a character from the medieval legends of Charlemagne
 Namo language, a Papuan language in the Nambu dialect cluster of Papua New Guinea
 Namo Media, a technology company that provides in-stream advertisements for mobile applications
 Namassej or Namo, a community of Bengal

See also
 Namas (disambiguation)
 Namo amitabha, a Mahāyāna Buddhist text in the Pure Land Buddhist schools
 Namo, Namo, Matha, former first line of the national anthem of Sri Lanka